The 25th edition of the annual Hypo-Meeting took place on May 29 and May 30, 1999 in Götzis, Austria. The track and field competition, featuring a decathlon (men) and a heptathlon (women) event, was part of the 1999 IAAF World Combined Events Challenge. Tomáš Dvořák set a new meet record with a total number of 8738 points in the men's decathlon.

Men's decathlon

Schedule

May 29

May 30

Records

Results

Women's heptathlon

Schedule

May 29

May 30

Records

Results

Notes

See also
1999 World Championships in Athletics – Men's decathlon
1999 Decathlon Year Ranking
1999 World Championships in Athletics – Women's heptathlon
1999 Heptathlon Year Ranking

References
 decathlon2000
 IAAF results
 decathlonfans
 IAAF 1999 World Year Ranking Heptathlon
 athletix

1999
Hypo-Meeting
Hypo-Meeting